Carey Baptist Church, is a Baptist church in Preston, Lancashire, England.  It is recorded in the National Heritage List for England as a designated Grade II listed building. It is affiliated with the Baptist Union of Great Britain.

History

The church was built in 1826 for the Countess of Huntingdon's Connexion.  The building has since been altered and used as a Baptist church.

Architecture

Exterior
Carey Baptist Church is built in brick. with a stuccoed entrance front and a slate roof.  It has a rectangular plan, it is in two storeys, and there is a small lean-to extension at the back.  The entrance front faces the road, it is symmetrical, and is in three bays.  There are pilasters at the corners, and at the top is a gable acting as a pediment.  In the ground floor are three doorways, the central doorway being wider than the outer doorways, all with fanlights under moulded surrounds containing keystones.  The central doorway has a segmental head and contains double doors, the outer doorways being round-headed.  In the upper storey are three round-headed windows with moulded surrounds and keystones.  The pediment contains a panel flanked by roundels.  The panel is inscribed with "CAREY BAPTIST".  Along the sides of the church are tall segmental-headed windows.

Interior
Inside the church there was originally a horseshoe gallery, but this has been reduced in size to a curved gallery.  This has a panelled front and is carried in slim cast iron columns.  Around the church is a dentilled cornice, the ceiling is panelled, and the windows have moulded surrounds.  At the west end is a plastered Corinthian architraved opening with a modillion cornice and an inscribed frieze.

See also

Listed buildings in Preston, Lancashire

References

Preston, Carey Baptist Church
Baptist churches in Lancashire
Churches in Preston
Churches completed in 1826
1826 establishments in England